Get Off the Stage is the seventeenth studio album by the American rapper Too $hort. It was released on December 4, 2007, through Jive Records, making it his fourteenth and final album on the label. Recording sessions took place at Blue Basement Recordings and at PatchWerk Recording Studios in Atlanta and at Young L Productions Studio. Production was handled by Traxamillion, Cooly C, DJ Kizzy Rock, Spec, Anthony Taylor, Gennessee and Young L, with Too $hort serving as executive producer. It features guest appearances from Dolla Will, E-40, Ginger, Kool-Ace, Mistah F.A.B., Ms. Hollywood, and The Pack. The album peaked at number 160 on the Billboard 200 and number 21 on the Top R&B/Hip-Hop Albums in the United States.

Track listing

Personnel

Todd "Too $hort" Shaw – main artist, executive producer
Earl "E-40" Stevens – featured artist (track 3)
Stanley "Mistah F.A.B." Cox, Jr. – featured artist (track 5)
Ms. Hollywood – featured artist (track 5)
Ginger – featured artist (track 5)
Brandon "Lil B" McCartney – featured artist (track 7)
DaMonte "Lil Uno" Johnson – featured artist (track 7)
Keith "Stunnaman" Jenkins – featured artist (track 7)
Lloyd "Young L" Omadhebo – featured artist, producer & recording (track 7)
Brian "Kool-Ace" Fleming – featured artist (track 8)
Will "Dolla Will" Scott, Jr. – featured artist (track 9)
Tanu – backing vocals (track 10)
Carl "Cooly C" Dorsey – producer (tracks: 1, 8)
Lloyd "Spec" Turner – producer (tracks: 1, 8)
Sultan "Traxamillion" Banks – producer (tracks: 2-4)
Gennessee Lewis – producer (track 5)
Anthony Taylor – producer (track 6)
Carlos "DJ Kizzy Rock" Young – producer (tracks: 9-10)
Taj "Mahal" Tilghman – recording (tracks: 1, 2, 4-6, 8-10), coordinator
Kori Anders – recording (tracks: 2, 9), mixing assistant (tracks: 2, 5, 7, 8, 10)
Dale Everingham – recording (tracks: 3, 5)
Leslie Brathwaite – mixing (tracks: 1-5, 7-10)
Don "DJ Snake" Brown – mixing (track 6)
Justin Trawick – mixing assistant (tracks: 1, 3, 4, 9)
Bernie Grundman – mastering
Meghan Foley – art direction, design
Erwin Gorostiza – art direction
Peter Graham – photography
Shay Young – A&R
Shari Reich – A&R
Toi Green – A&R
Cara Hutchinson – coordinator
Damon Ellis – legal
David Schmidt – legal
Donato Guadagnoli – legal
Lisa Pinero – legal

Charts

References

External links

2007 albums
Too Short albums
Jive Records albums